The Haya Party (translated as Life Party) is a political party started by Coptic activist Mikel Mounir.

References

Coptic organizations
Political parties in Egypt
Political parties with year of establishment missing
Political parties of minorities
Secularism in Egypt